Sueko Matsueda Kimura (June 10, 1912 – December 25, 2001) was an American artist.  She was born in Papaikou, Hawaii in 1912.  She received her Bachelor of Arts and Master of Fine Arts degrees from the University of Hawaii at Manoa, where she met fellow art student Keichi Kimura, whom she married in 1942.  She also attended the Chouinard Art Institute (Los Angeles), Columbia University (New York City), the Brooklyn Museum Art School (New York City), and with Yasuo Kuniyoshi at the Art Students League of New York.  She taught at the University of Hawaii at Manoa from 1952 until her retirement as Professor of Art in 1977.

The Hawaii State Art Museum and the Honolulu Museum of Art hold work by Sueko Matsueda Kimura.

References
 Haar, Francis and Neogy, Prithwish, "Artists of Hawaii: Nineteen Painters and Sculptors", University of Hawaii Press, 1974, 74-80.
 Morse, Morse (ed.), Honolulu Printmakers, Honolulu, HI, Honolulu Academy of Arts, 2003, p. 43, 
 Morse, Marcia, "Inner World, Outer World: The Art of Keichi and Sueko Kimura", Honolulu Academy of Arts, 2001.
 Morse, Marcia, Legacy: Facets of Island Modernism, Honolulu, Honolulu Academy of Arts, 2001, pp. 53–58
 Wisnosky, John and Tom Klobe, A Tradition of Excellence, University of Hawai'i, Honolulu, 2002, pp. 64–67
 Yoshihara, Lisa A., Collective Visions, 1967-1997, Hawaii State Foundation on Culture and the Arts, Honolulu, Hawaii, 1997, 30.

Footnotes

1912 births
2001 deaths
American women painters
Painters from Hawaii
American artists of Japanese descent
Art Students League of New York alumni
Artists from Honolulu
20th-century American painters
20th-century American women artists
University of Hawaiʻi faculty
American women academics